This is the discography of American rapper Inspectah Deck.

Studio albums

Mixtapes

Czarface

Singles

Guest appearances

Production credits 

1995

Wu-Tang Clan - Tales from the Hood The Soundtrack
 "Let Me at Them"

1997

Wu-Tang Clan - Wu-Tang Forever
 "Visionz"

1998

Inspectah Deck (ft. Streetlife) - Wu-Tang Killa Bees: The Swarm
 "S.O.S."

Method Man - Tical 2000: Judgement Day
 "Spazzola"
 "Elements"

RZA - Bobby Digital in Stereo
 "Kiss of a Black Widow"

1999

GZA - Beneath The Surface
 "Beneath The Surface"

Inspectah Deck - Uncontrolled Substance
 "Femme Fatale"
 "Word on the Street"
 "Elevation"
 "Hyperdermix"
 "The Cause"

U-God - Golden Arms Redemption
 "Glide"

2000

Ghostface Killah - Supreme Clientele
 "Stay True"

2001

Cappadonna - The Yin and the Yang
 "Revenge"

2005

Streetlife - Street Education
 "A Star Is Born"

2006

Inspectah Deck - The Resident Patient
 "Get Ya Weight Up"
 "My Style"

2009

Fes Taylor - Flight 10304 (T-2 Fly)
 "Show Something"
 "CMG Salutes La Banga"

2010

Inspectah Deck - Manifesto
 "Luv Letter"
 "T.R.U.E."
 "We Get Down"
 "9th Chamber Part II"
 "Really Real"

2013

Masta Killa - Selling My Soul
 "R U Listening?"

References

External links 

Discographies of American artists